Kim McCosker is an Australian author, responsible for the popular 4 Ingredients series of cookbooks.

4 Ingredients
Kim McCosker has been called "cooking's J. K. Rowling." After being turned down by every major publisher in Australia, she self-published her first cookbook, 4 Ingredients, which went on to become the best selling self-published book in Australian history, selling 400,000 copies in 2007 alone and placing second in overall sales only to Rowling's Harry Potter and the Deathly Hallows released the same year.

4 Ingredients has gone on to reach a total sales mark of over 3 million copies. The initial 4 Ingredients book has spawned 37 cookbooks and made 4 Ingredients a very successful publishing house and one of the most trusted cookbook brands in Australia.

The collective sales across all titles now exceeds 9 million copies. The brand's popularity having extended to a cookware range, 4 Ingredients iPhone app. and large social media reach; with an active daily presence on Facebook, Instagram, Pinterest and their own website.

The popularity of the 4 Ingredients series has also led to a 4 Ingredients television series, hosted by McCosker, and broadcast in 24 countries including Australia, Africa, the UK, and New Zealand.

In 2020 4 Ingredients has significant market penetration, brand awareness and relevancy. It appears people's interest in cooking at home is only intensifying, along with their love of all things easy!

Other publications 
 4 Ingredients
 4 Ingredients 2
 4 Ingredients Gluten Free
 4 Ingredients Fast, Fresh & Healthy (co-authored by Deepak Chopra)
 4 Ingredients Kids (black & white)
 BABY BOWL
 4 Ingredients Christmas
 4 Ingredients KiDS (illustrated)
 4 Ingredients Herb it Up (written for Gourmet Garden)
 4 Ingredients One Pot One Bowl
 4 Ingredients Chocolates, Cakes & Cute Things
 4 Ingredients Menu Planning
 ThermoStruck
 4 Ingredients YIAH
 4PLAY
 4 Ingredients Gluten Free Lactose Free (endorsed by Coeliac Australia)
 4 Ingredients Diabetes (endorsed by Diabetes Australia - Victoria)
 4 Ingredients Allergies (endorsed by Allergies & Anaphylaxis NZ)
 4 Ingredients Cook 4 A Cure (written to raise funds for the NBCF)
 4 Ingredients Celebrations
 4 Ingredients The Easiest One Pot Cookbook Ever!
 The Easiest Slow Cooker Book Ever!
 4 Ingredients Healthy Diet
 PET COOKBOOK
 4 Ingredients KETO
 4 Ingredients Veggie & Vegan
 The Easiest Pie Maker Book Ever!
 The Easiest Air Fryer Book Ever!
 4 Ingredients MORE Diabetes (due out April 2021)

Personal
McCosker lives Sunshine Coast, Queensland with husband Glen Turnbull and their three children.

References

External links

Australian writers
Women cookbook writers
People from Queensland
Year of birth missing (living people)
Living people